The 1919 Fergus Falls tornado was a large and destructive tornado that struck Fergus Falls, Minnesota on Sunday, June 22, 1919. It killed 57 people and is the second deadliest tornado in Minnesota's history (1st was the 1886 Sauk Rapids tornado).  This tornado occurred just 10 months after a tornado in Tyler, Minnesota killed 36 people.  That twister was Minnesota's fourth deadliest on record.

The tornado
It hit Fergus Falls at approximately 4:46 pm, and according to witness accounts was a "blank funnel shaped twisting cloud, or possibly several of them". Though the Fujita scale did not exist at that time, it is estimated to have been an F5 based on descriptions and photographs of the damage.

Damage

The tornado tore through the northern part of town, leveling 44 city blocks (including the business district), destroying 159 homes and damaging 250 more, some of which were swept completely away.  Of the 57 people who died, at least 35 of them were in the Grand Hotel, a three-story, 100 room hotel which was completely flattened.  Two hundred more were injured.  The tornado also destroyed the Otter Tail County courthouse, the county jail, four churches and multiple other businesses. Small trees in town were debarked, and railroad tracks were reportedly pulled from the ground at one location, indicative of extreme intensity. The Northern Pacific rail depot was completely destroyed, and reportedly swept away. At Lake Alice, several summer homes were swept into the water along with their occupants, resulting in several fatalities there. The Great Northern Oriental Limited passenger train was thrown off the tracks by the tornado, but none of the 250 passengers on the train was seriously injured.  Checks that were sucked up by the tornado in Fergus Falls were found 60 miles to the east.

See also
 1918 Tyler tornado
 1886 Sauk Rapids tornado
 Climate of Minnesota
 List of F5 and EF5 tornadoes
 List of tornadoes causing 100 or more deaths

References

External links
 Gendisasters.com
 NWS Grand Forks article of the Fergus Falls tornado

1919 in Minnesota
1919 natural disasters in the United States
F5 tornadoes
Fergus Falls, Minnesota
Natural disasters in Minnesota
Tornadoes of 1919
Tornadoes in Minnesota
June 1919 events